James Lorenzo Wattenbarger (May 2, 1922 – August 14, 2006) was an American educator.

A native of Cleveland, Tennessee, Wattenbarger is credited as being the Father of the Community College System of Florida. His doctoral dissertation at the University of Florida outlined a master plan that the state used in 1955 to create the modern community college system.

Wattenbarger returned to the University of Florida in 1968 to become a professor, and he founded the Institute of Higher Education. He was an active faculty member at the University of Florida until his retirement in 1992.

Santa Fe College named the Wattenbarger Student Services Building  after him in 1995.

Education
 Associate degree from Palm Beach Junior College in 1941
 Bachelor's degree from the University of Florida in 1943
 Master's degree from University of Florida in 1947
 Doctorate in Education from the University of Florida in 1950

References

External links
Official NY Times Obituary
Info on Dr. Wattenbarger

1922 births
University of Florida faculty
University of Florida alumni
2006 deaths
Palm Beach State College alumni
20th-century American academics